Mathijs Tielemans (born 26 April 2002) is a Dutch footballer who plays for Jong PSV as a midfielder.

References

2002 births
Living people
Dutch footballers
PSV Eindhoven players
Jong PSV players
Eerste Divisie players
Association football midfielders